Doris tanya is a species of sea slug, a dorid nudibranch, a marine gastropod mollusc in the family Dorididae. Named after Tanya, Gale G. Sphon's cat.

Distribution
This species was described from California where it is predominantly an intertidal species. It has been redescribed with specimens from Southern California to Panama.

References

Dorididae
Gastropods described in 1971